North Melbourne Locomotive Depot was the main location for maintenance of the Victorian Railways steam locomotive fleet based in Melbourne. Located in the middle of the Melbourne Yard precinct in the suburb West Melbourne near North Melbourne station, the site is now occupied by the Melbourne Steel Terminal. The depot was described by railway employees as "the hub of the universe", "the VR's nearest approach to Dante's Inferno", or "the Black Hole of Calcutta" depending on their disposition.

History

The depot was opened sometime in the 1880s by the Victorian Railways, replacing its first locomotive depot located in the Spencer Street station yard. It was located beside the Railway Canal, a section of Moonee Ponds Creek that enabled the direct unloading of coal transported by sea from New South Wales. The rectangular building was built of brick and iron with three turntables located inside. There were six track entrances, two at the front from the main goods yard, three from the stabling roads, and one at the rear. A three road coal stage was located to the south of the depot, along with a number of open air stabling roads.

As late as the 1950s the depot housed 160 locomotives, but with dieselisation from 1952 the end was near. The new South Dynon Locomotive Depot was opened across the creek for the new locomotives as part of the North East standard gauge project, with the last steam-hauled train leaving Melbourne on 18 May 1964 - R703 on the 18:05 to Geelong. The depot was ceremoniously demolished on 20 January 1965 when steam locomotive K188 pulled down the front wall of the depot with a steel rope in front of a crowd of onlookers.

References

External links
Weston Langford's photos of the demolition:  

Buildings and structures demolished in 1965
Railway workshops in Victoria (Australia)
History of rail transport in Australia
Demolished buildings and structures in Melbourne
1880s establishments in Australia
Buildings and structures completed in the 1880s
1964 disestablishments in Australia